The ALCS Tom-Gallon Trust Award is an annual award of £1,000 for a short story, financed by a bequest made by Nellie Tom-Gallon in memory of her brother, playwright and novelist Tom Gallon (1866–1914). The story should be traditional, not experimental, in character. The ALCS Tom-Gallon Trust Award is generously supported by the Authors' Licensing and Collecting Society (ALCS) and is administered by the Society of Authors. Previous recipients include  Man Booker Prize nominee Alison MacLeod, Simon van Booy and Claire Keegan.

List of Award winners

2020s 
2022

 Winner: Kanya D’Almeida for 'I Cleaned The—'
 Runner-up: Dean Gessie for Head Smashed in Buffalo Jump'''2021 Winner: DM O'Connor for "I Told You not to Fly so High"
 Runner-up: Sean Lusk for "The Hopelessness of Hope"2020 Winner: Wendy Riley for "Eva at the End of the World"
 Runner-up: Diana Powell for "Whale Watching"

2010s2019 Winner: Dima Alzayat for "Once We Were Syrians"
 Runner-up: Bunmi Ogunsiji for "Blessing"2018 Winner: Chris Connolly for |"The Speed of Light and How it Cannot Help Us"
 Runner-up: Benjamin Myers for "A Thousand Acres of English Soil"2017 Winner: Frances Thimann for "Shells"
 Runner-up: Becky Tipper for "The Rabbit"2016 Winner: Claire Harman for "Otherwise Engaged"
 Runner-up: Jessie Greengrass for "Dolphin"2015 Winner: Maria C. McCarthy for "More Katharine Than Audrey"
 Runner-up: Caroline Price for "Vin Rouge"2014 Winner: Benjamin Myers for "The Folk Song Singer"
 Runner-up: Claire Harman for "Poor Maggie Kirkpatrick"2013 Winner: Samuel Wright for "Best Friend"
 Runner-up: Lucy Wood for "Wisht"2011 Emma Timpany for "The Pledge"
 Runner-up: Miriam Burke for "A Splash of Words"2010 Winner: Carys Davies for "The Quiet"
 Runners-up: Susannah Rickards for "The Paperback Macbeth" and Simon Van Booy for "Little Birds"

2000s2009 Winner: Rosemary Mairs for "My Father's Hands"
 Runner-up: Huw Lawrence for "Keeping On"2008 Alison MacLeod for "Dirty Weekend"2007 Claire Keegan for "The Parting Gift"2006 Bethan Roberts for "An Elephant in the Thames"2005 Colette Paul for "O Tell me the Truth About Love"2004 Claire Keegan for "Men and Women"2003 Judith Ravenscroft for "As She Waited for Spring"2001 Paul Blaney for "Apple Tennis"

1990s1999 Grace Ingoldby for "The Notion of Deuce"1996 Leo Madigan for "Packing for Wednesday"1994 Janice Fox for "A Good Place to Die"1992 David Callard for "Reading the Signals"1990 Richard Austin for "Sister Monica's Last Journey"

1980s1988 Alan Beard for "Taking Doreen Out of the Sky"1986 Lawrence Scott for "The House of Funerals"1984 Janni Howker for "The Egg Man"1982 Dermot Healy for "The Tenant"1980 Alan McConnell for "The Comrades Marathon"

1970s1978 Michael Morrissey for "An Evening with Ionesco"1976 Jackson Webb for "Vassili"1974 Neilson Graham for "Anscombe"1972 Kathleen Julian for "Catch Two"1970 A. Craig Bell for "The Nest / Aileen Pennington The Princess and the Pussy-cat"

1960s1966 Gillian Edwards for "An Evening in September"1964 Peter Greave for "The Wonderful Day / Jean Stubbs A Child's Four Seasons"

1950s1959 Harold Elvin for "God's Right Hand Upon My Shoulder"1957 E. W. Hildick for "A Casual Visit"1955 Robert Roberts for "Conducted Tour"1953 Maurice Cranston for "A Visit to the Author"1951 Fred Urquhart for "The Ploughing Match"

1940s1949 Olivia Manning for "The Children"1947 Dorothy K. Haynes for "The Head"1945 Jack Aistrop for "Death in the Midst of What"  1943'''
 Elizabeth Myers for "A Well Full of Leaves"

References 

Short story awards